Rupela jana is a moth in the family Crambidae. It was described by Carl Heinrich in 1937. It is found in Panama, the Guianas, Brazil, Peru, Paraguay and Argentina.

The wingspan is 29–47 mm. The wings are white.

References

Moths described in 1937
Schoenobiinae
Taxa named by Carl Heinrich